Danila Turchin (born January 22, 1978) is an Uzbekistani sprint canoer who competed in the mid-2000s. At the 2004 Summer Olympics in Athens, he was eliminated in the semifinals of both the K-1 1000 m and the K-2 1000 m events.

References

External links
Sports-Reference.com profile
Olympic.org profile

1978 births
Canoeists at the 2004 Summer Olympics
Living people
Olympic canoeists of Uzbekistan
Uzbekistani male canoeists
Asian Games medalists in canoeing
Canoeists at the 2002 Asian Games
Medalists at the 2002 Asian Games
Asian Games bronze medalists for Uzbekistan